The United States competed at the 1980 Winter Paralympics in Geilo, Norway. 26 competitors from the United States won four gold medals, one silver medal and one bronze medal and finished 6th in the medal table. All medals were won in alpine skiing.

Alpine skiing 

The medalists are:

  Cindy Castellano, Women's Giant Slalom 3A
  Cindy Castellano, Women's Slalom 3A
  Doug Keil, Men's Giant Slalom 4
  Doug Keil, Men's Slalom 4
  Kathy Poohachof Women's Giant Slalom 3A
  Janet Penn, Women's Giant Slalom 2A

Cross-country 

Seven athletes competed in events in cross-country skiing. No medals were won.

Ice sledge speed racing 

Peter Axelson competed in three events (Men's 100 m II, Men's 500 m II and Men's 1500 m II).  He did not win any medals.

See also 

 United States at the Paralympics
 United States at the 1980 Winter Olympics

References 

1980
1980 in American sports
Nations at the 1980 Winter Paralympics